Dhaka experiences a hot, wet and humid tropical climate. Under the Köppen climate classification, Dhaka has a tropical wet and dry climate. Nearly 80% of the annual average rainfall of  occurs during the monsoon season which lasts from May until the end of September. Increasing air and water pollution emanating from traffic congestion and industrial waste are serious problems affecting public health and the quality of life in the city. Water bodies and wetlands around Dhaka are facing destruction as these are being filled up to construct multi-storied buildings and other real estate developments. Coupled with pollution, such erosion of natural habitats threatens to destroy much of the regional biodiversity.

Cold weather is unusual in and around Dhaka.

Factors
Dhaka has a tropical wet and dry climate. The monsoon season brings nearly 80% of the annual average rainfall of 1,854 millimeters (73 in) occurs between May and September.
Southwest Monsoon occurs from June till September during the summer months. During this period very heavy rainfall lashes the city as well as the entire country. Flash floods are common in Dhaka almost every year.
Tropical Storms do occur during the summer months from April till June and then from September till December. These cyclones occur almost every year in Bangladesh though their intensity varies from year to year.
Tornadoes are fairly common in Bangladesh as it is one of the most frequently hit countries in the world, behind the United States and Canada.

Impact of climate change
Climate change has forced many people of Bangladesh living in rural areas to migrate to cities that has caused a sharp rise in the slum population of Dhaka. As Bangladesh is already less than 20 feet above sea level, thus there are fears that by the end of the 21st century, more than a quarter of the country will be inundated and 15 million people will be displaced. The population of Dhaka, currently 13 million people, is projected to increase to 20 million by the year 2025. This raises fears of water-borne diseases and outbreaks of several other diseases. While a UN and WWF report warned that Dhaka tops the risk of climate change in Asia.

Monsoon rainfall of Dhaka
The Monsoon season begins from June till September. The following is the annual monsoon rainfall for the last few years based on data from the Bangladesh Meteorological Department.

Extreme weather events
Extreme weather events include tropical cyclones, tornadoes, cloudburst and flash floods.
In 1956, about 326 millimetres (12.8 in) of rain was recorded in 24 hours in Dhaka.
In 1970, a Category-3 tropical cyclone killed 500,000 people in the coastal area, which also had a severe impact in Dhaka.
In 1989, a tornado killed 1,300 people in Dhaka Division.
In 1991, a Category-5 tropical cyclone ravaged coastal Bangladesh, impacting Dhaka with severe rain and damaging wind.
In 2004, a record-breaking 341 millimetres (13.4 in) mm of rain was recorded in Dhaka in 24 hours.
In 2009, about 333 millimetres (13.1 in) of rain was recorded in Dhaka in 24 hours.

Statistics

References

Dhaka
Dhaka